Dimbulagala also known as Gunner's Quoin or Gunner's Rock during the British colonial period, is a rock formation in the Polonnaruwa District of Sri Lanka. By the time anthropologist Charles Gabriel Seligman visited the location in 1911, a cave within the rock had become a refuge of the indigenous Vedda people. During the 12th century AD, The Sinhalese people had constructed a Buddhist monastery within the rock formation. The Dimbulagala Raja Maha Vihara monastery was restored in the 1950s. The villagers around the rock are of mixed Vedda and Sinhalese ancestry.

See also
Dimbulagala Raja Maha Vihara

References

Landforms of Polonnaruwa District
Vedda